Ľubomír Michalík (born 13 August 1983) is a Slovak professional footballer who plays for as a centre-back for Slovan Galanta.

Club career

Bolton Wanderers
Michalík was born in Čadca. He signed for Bolton Wanderers in January 2007 from Senec of Slovakia on a three and a half-year contract for an undisclosed transfer fee. On 28 April 2007, Michalík scored his first and only goal for Bolton, in a 2–2 away draw against Chelsea at Stamford Bridge.

Leeds United
In March 2007, Michalík made a loan switch to Leeds United on a one-month loan deal. The defender's performances earned a great deal of credit from the Leeds faithful, particularly due to his match-winning goal on 7 April in a 2–1 victory over Plymouth Argyle. As a result of his strong performances, then Leeds manager Dennis Wise extended the Slovakian's loan deal until the end of the season, although Bolton recalled Michalik back due to a spate of injuries to their first choice centre-backs. Michalik played the rest of the season with Bolton and even managed to score against Chelsea at Stamford Bridge. During his spell back at Bolton, Leeds were relegated to League 1.

Wise continued to reiterate his liking for the player, and attempted to re-sign the defender in the January 2008 transfer window. A deal was reported to be closed, believed to be involving a £500,000 fee, when Wise left the manager's post to head for Newcastle United. However, upon the appointment of Gary McAllister as Leeds boss, the Yorkshire side remained insistent on their determination to sign the Slovak. On the final day of the transfer window, a deal was concluded and Michalik signed a three-and-a-half-year deal. Bolton seemed willing to sell having recruited Gary Cahill as a replacement. Michalik made 13 first-team appearances in the 2007–08 season.

Michalík managed to establish himself as one of Leeds' first-choice defenders, often partnering Paul Huntington. On 6 September 2008, Michalik was sent off in a match for Leeds against Crewe Alexandra for his second bookable offence. Leeds went on and won the match 5–2. During the middle of the 08/09 season after a number of inconsistent performances Michalik was dropped from the Leeds team by new manager Simon Grayson in favour of new loan signing Richard Naylor. Michalik never regained a starting place and found himself on the bench for the remainder of the season. A role which has continued into the 2009–10 season.

Michalik scored his second goal for Leeds which was his first since signing a permanent deal against Stockport County on 5 September 2009. He started the 2009–10 season mainly as a substitute, but had been required to come off the bench on several occasions and play a vital role for Leeds. It has been said his form has greatly improved under manager Simon Grayson. Michalik had a goal wrongly ruled out for offside in the League Cup tie against Liverpool. Replays showed that Jermaine Beckford and Luciano Becchio were onside. Michalik started the game for Leeds against Brighton & Hove Albion, and with Richard Naylor still injured Michalik once again partnered Patrick Kisnorbo at centre back against Leyton Orient and kept consecutive clean sheets. Michalik started the game against Kettering Town and was judged to be at fault for the goal conceded with Casper Ankergren also sharing the blame. Despite the error Michalik started his 4th game in a row in the league game against Oldham Athletic. Michalik kept his place in the Leeds team for the game against Huddersfield Town and the FA Cup replay against Kettering Town. Michalik is one of the free-kick takers for Leeds United and is known to strike a ball at over 100 MPH, although he is yet to score one of these. With injuries to fellow centre back's Patrick Kisnorbo and Richard Naylor at various points, Michalik has been able to get a regular run of games for Leeds.

Michalik came on as a late substitute in Leeds 1–0 win against Manchester United at Old Trafford in the FA Cup 3rd round. Michalik came on as a half time substitute in Leeds' defeat to Swindon Town, he returned to Leeds' starting line-up against Colchester United and with Patrick Kisnorbo still out injured Michalik retained his place in the side for the matches against Tottenham Hotspur in the FA Cup replay, and also the league game against Hartlepool. With Kisnorbo still out injured Michalik retained his place in Leeds' JPT second leg game against Carlisle United but he was at fault for one of the goals conceded after a horrendous miskick gave the ball straight to Kevan Hurst who slotted the ball home, Leeds lost the tie 6–5 on penalties. The following game Michalik dropped to the bench against Leyton Orient. Michalik made scarce appearances from then until the end of the season, after a spell out the squad he returned to the bench against Bristol Rovers a game which Leeds won 2–1 and saw them promoted to The Championship as runners up. Following promotion United manager, Simon Grayson, transfer listed Michalik.

On 14 May 2010, after receiving a call up to Slovakia's provisional World Cup squad, Michalik was instructed by Leeds to find a new club and placed on the transfer list. He did not play a single game for Leeds' first team during the 2010–11 pre-season friendlies.

Carlisle United
On 31 August 2010, Michalik joined League One club Carlisle United on loan until 3 January 2011. Michalik made his debut in the 0–0 draw against Swindon Town after coming into Carlisle's starting 11 as a replacement for the recently departed Ian Harte. Michalik's second game for Carlisle came against League leaders Sheffield Wednesday with Carlisle picking up a clean sheet and earning a 1–0 away win. Michalik helped Carlisle keep a 3rd successive clean sheet in his third game for the club against Brighton.

Michalik scored his first goal for Carlisle against Hartlepool with a 40-yard freekick. After picking up a hamstring injury Michalik returned to Leeds to have his injury assessed. However, returned to Carlisle after only spending a few days having treatment at his parent club. After missing games with a hamstring injury, Michalik returned to the starting line-up against Bristol Rovers. Leeds refused permission for Michalik to play for Carlisle in the FA Cup against Tipton Town. Michalik was sent off in Carlisle's fixture against Rochdale for two bookable offences.

Michalik scored his second goal for Carlisle against Sheffield Wednesday in the Football League Trophy to help Carlisle reach the Northern Area final. In December 2010. Michalik revealed he was interested in extending his loan deal until the end of the season. 

In January 2011, Michalik had the remaining six-months of his contract terminated by Leeds to allow him to find a new club. On 14 January, Michalik re-signed for Carlisle on a permanent deal. He is believed to be a transfer target of Hibernian and left Carlisle United in June after rejecting a new contract. Eventually, Michalik rejected a chance to move to Hibernian with the agreement couldn't be reached.

Portsmouth
On 14 September 2012, Michalik signed for League One side Portsmouth on a one-month deal. Michalik scored on his Portsmouth debut in a 2–1 loss at Fratton Park against Swindon Town. In a televised match on Sky Sports against Sheffield United on 30 October 2012, Michalik made a mistake when he tackled Chris Porter in the penalty box, resulting a penalty to an opposition team and was converted by Nick Blackman, to make it 1–0 and the score stayed the same until full-time. After the match, Manager Michael Appleton says Michalik learned his lesson over his action. Despite this, Michalik continued to be in the regular first team and was released alongside four players on 15 January 2013, having decided not to renewed his contract.

Kairat Almaty
Shortly being released by Portsmouth, Michalik joined Kazakhstan side FC Kairat, where he will be joined by former national manager Vladimír Weiss. Michalík was released by Kairat following the completion of the 2014 season.

International career
Michalík's international debut came on 10 December 2006 in the second half of the Slovakia versus United Arab Emirates friendly game. His first international goal came in the same game. He played his second match against Republic of Ireland on 28 March 2007.

On 1 October 2009, Michalík received an international recall for the World Cup qualifiers against Slovenia and Poland. Michalik was an unused substitute in the World Cup Qualifier against Poland.

On 11 May 2010, Michalík was named in Slovakia's 29-man provisional squad for the 2010 FIFA World Cup in South Africa. He was, however, left out of the final 23-man Slovakia World Cup Squad when it was announced on 3 June.

On 11 October 2011, Michalík became the first Carlisle United player to play in a competitive international match since Eric Welsh who represented Northern Ireland team in 1967 (although teammate Peter Murphy did play in a friendly match for the Republic of Ireland in 2007). Michalík then played the full 90 minutes in a 1–1 draw with Macedonia in a Euro 2012 qualifier, Michalík was denied an 89th-minute winner by a Martin Bogatinov save.

Career statistics

Club
. 

a.  Includes other competitive competitions, including the Football League Trophy, UEFA Cup and Europa League.

International goals

Honours
Leeds United
Football League One runner-up (1): 2009–10

Carlisle United
Football League Trophy (1): 2010–11

FC Kairat
 Kazakhstan Cup (1): 2014

ŠKF Sereď
 2. Liga (1): 2017-18

References

External links

Michalik a Bolton player 
Futbalnet profile 

1983 births
Living people
People from Čadca
Sportspeople from the Žilina Region
Association football defenders
Slovak footballers
Slovakia international footballers
Slovak expatriate footballers
FC Senec players
Bolton Wanderers F.C. players
Leeds United F.C. players
Carlisle United F.C. players
Portsmouth F.C. players
FC Kairat players
FC DAC 1904 Dunajská Streda players
ŠKF Sereď players
FC Slovan Galanta players
Slovak Super Liga players
2. Liga (Slovakia) players
3. Liga (Slovakia) players
Premier League players
English Football League players
Kazakhstan Premier League players
Slovak expatriate sportspeople in England
Slovak expatriate sportspeople in Kazakhstan
Expatriate footballers in England
Expatriate footballers in Kazakhstan